Zatrephes nitida is a moth in the family Erebidae. It was detailed by Pieter Cramer in 1780. It is found in French Guiana and Suriname.

References

Phaegopterina
Moths described in 1780
Moths of South America